Stephen Keith Matthews (born October 13, 1970) is a former American football quarterback in the National Football League. He played five seasons for the Kansas City Chiefs, Jacksonville Jaguars, and Tennessee Oilers, later the Titans, (formerly Houston Oilers). He played collegiately at the Harford Community College of Harford County, Maryland in Churchville for the Fighting Owls and later at the University of Memphis for the Tigers. He is currently suspended as head football coach for receiving a DUI and having prescription pain pills in his vehicle with no prescription at Knoxville Catholic High School in Knoxville, Tennessee.

Professional career
Matthews was drafted in the seventh round (199th overall) in the 1994 NFL Draft by the Kansas City Chiefs. After three seasons with no playing time, he left and joined the Jacksonville Jaguars. With the Jaguars, Matthews played in two games and started one. In his first start on September 7, 1997, Matthews led Jacksonville to a win over the New York Giants by completing 23 of 35 passes with no interceptions. He would then play for the Tennessee Titans during the 1998 season. He played in just one game, completing 2 of 3 passes for 24 yards. He would be released at the end of the '98 Season.

References

1970 births
Living people
People from Tullahoma, Tennessee
Players of American football from Tennessee
American football quarterbacks
Memphis Tigers football players
Harford Fighting Owls football players
Kansas City Chiefs players
Scottish Claymores players
Jacksonville Jaguars players
Tennessee Oilers players